Rev. Joshua D. Jones House is a historic home located at Mill Spring, Polk County, North Carolina.  It was built in 1897, and is a two-story, three bay, frame I-house with a two-story rear ell.  A kitchen addition was built in 1925. It features a shed-roofed porch covering three-fourths of the lower facade.  Also on the property is the contributing one-room, frame store building and well.  It was the home of African-American community leader Rev. Joshua D. Jones of the Stony Knoll community.

It was added to the National Register of Historic Places in 1991.

References

African-American history of North Carolina
Houses on the National Register of Historic Places in North Carolina
Houses completed in 1897
Houses in Polk County, North Carolina
National Register of Historic Places in Polk County, North Carolina